Wings (1822–1842) was a British Thoroughbred racehorse that was the winner of 1825 Epsom Oaks. Her son Caravan won the Ascot Gold Cup in 1839 and her daughter Fiammetta won the French 2,000 Guineas.

Background
Wings was bred by General Thomas Grosvenor and was foaled in 1822 at his stud.

Racing career

1825: three-year-old season
In April during the first start of her career, Wings finished second to Mr Batson's colt Hogarth in a sweepstakes race at Newmarket. In May, she won a Gold Cup against Picton and was sold to Chifney for 250 sovereigns.

1826: four-year-old season

Breeding career
Mr Stonehewer's stud was sold on 2 July 1832 and Wings was bought by Mr. Greatrex for 125 guineas. By 1834, Wings was sold to the King and relocated to the Hampton Court stud. On 25 October, the entire Hampton Court Stud was liquidated at Tattersall's. The Classic winners Wings (600 guineas), Young Mouse (360 guineas) and Fleur-de-lis (550 guineas) were bought by Auguste Lupin and exported to his stud farm in Saint-Cloud, France. Wings produced six colts, one filly and one foal of unrecorded sex in England.
Wings died in 1842 at Lupin's stud after aborting her Lottery colt.

Wing's best racers were her 1834 colt Caravan and her 1838 French-born filly Fiammetta. Caravan was second in the 1837 Derby to Phosphorus and won the 1839 Ascot Gold Cup. Caravan was later exported to France as a breeding stallion. Fiammetta won the French 2,000 Guineas for Auguste Lupin, his first Classic win, but died in 1842 after dislocating a fetlock joint while running in the Pavilion Stakes at. Wing's 1837 colt Monops was blinded in one eye as a yearling due to an outbreak of "influenza" at the Hampton Court Stud shortly before the dispersal sale in 1837. As a result of the impairment, he was sold for only 46 guineas, but he could see well enough with one eye to withstand training and run, but not place, in the 1840 Derby.

Full progeny list
Foals produced in the United Kingdom include:
 1829, Chestnut colt by Middleton
 1830, Bay colt by Partisan
 1831, Pigeon, bay colt by Reveller
 1832, foal by Camel
 1833, Bay filly by Brutandorf
 1834, Caravan, brown colt by Camel
 1836, Feather, chestnut colt by Actaeon
 1837, Monops, chestnut colt by Actaeon

Foals produced in France include: 
 1838, Fiammetta, bay filly by Actaeon or Camel (imported in utero)
 1839, Romanesca, bay filly by Lottery
 1840, Bay filly by Lottery (died at weaning)
 1841, Bengali, brown colt by Ibrahim
 1842, aborted a bay colt by Lottery

Pedigree

References

1822 racehorse births
1842 racehorse deaths
Thoroughbred family 28
Byerley Turk sire line
Epsom Oaks winners